Paralatisternum ochreofasciculosum is a species of beetle in the family Cerambycidae, and the only species in the genus Paralatisternum. It was described by Breuning in 1963.

References

Ancylonotini
Beetles described in 1963
Monotypic beetle genera